Frank Albert Daniels (August 15, 1856 – January 12, 1935) was a comedian, an actor on stage, early black-and-white silent films, and a singer.<ref>[http://asp6new.alexanderstreet.com/atho/atho.detail.people.aspx?personcode=per0056224 Frank Daniels; North American Theatre Online]</ref>

Daniels was born on August 15, 1856 in Dayton, Ohio to Balinda and Henry Daniels, and was raised in Boston. He attended business school and the New England Conservatory of Music. His first stage appearance was a in production of Trial by Jury at the old Gaiety Theatre. He appeared in The Chimes of Normandy in 1879, and then worked with the McCaull Comic Opera Company and other light opera companies.

In New York, Daniels played Old Sport in A Rag Baby (1884); Packingham Giltedge in Little Puck (1888) (which was based on F. Anstey's novel Vice Versa); Shrimps in Princess Bonnie (1895); and the title role in Victor Herbert's The Wizard of the Nile (1895). Herbert was impressed, and created two roles for Daniels in his plays The Idol's Eye (1897) and The Ameer (1899). Later roles included The Tattooed Man (1907) by Herbert, The Belle of Brittany (1909), and The Pink Lady (1911). He retired in 1912.

He was a major star for Vitagraph Studios, for whom he developed popular characters such as Captain Jiggs, Kernel Nutt, and Mr. Jack. He appeared in three films with Harold Lloyd in 1919: Count the Votes, Pay Your Dues, and His Only Father. His last film was Among Those Present, in 1921.

He died on January 12, 1935, in West Palm Beach, Florida, at the age of 78. He was survived by three children.

Selected filmographyCrooky (1915)Flare-Up Sal (1918)
 Pay Your Dues (1919)Among Those Present'' (1921)

References

External links

Frank Daniels portrait gallery NY Public Library, Billy Rose Collection
The Famous Frank Daniels
 Frank Daniels portraits(University of Louisville, Macauley Theatre Collection)

19th-century American male actors
20th-century American male actors
1856 births
1935 deaths
American male silent film actors
American male stage actors
New England Conservatory alumni
Male actors from Dayton, Ohio